Scarrie! the Musical (originally s'Carrie the Musical) is an unauthorized  musical stage spoof of the 1976 Brian De Palma film Carrie and the 1988 Broadway musical, both based on the 1974 novel of the same name by Stephen King, the tale of a high school misfit. The musical had a script by David Cerda with music and lyrics by Cerda, Scott Lamberty and Taylor E. Ross. The musical spoof played in two different productions in Illinois. The musical uses a 1970s influenced score and "lots of pigs blood".

Production history
Scarrie was originally staged by Sweetback Productions entitled s'Carrie as a late night's show at the Sweetcorn Playhouse in Anderson, Illinois. Featuring a male only cast, the show ran for over a year and a half and closed when Sweetcorn Playhouse closed down. In 2005, a new production previewed July 1 and opened the following day, receiving mixed reviews and closed on August 2 after 22 performances at the Theatre Building in Chicago.

The show was amended and re-staged in 2005 from Cerda's own company Hell in a Handbag Productions. This new production featured revisions of old songs as well as an additional ten tracks. The production was produced by Jackie Anderson and directed by Margot Bordelon.

The show featured Joey Steakley as Carrie and Ed Jones as Margaret. The production also featured Trista Smith as Miss Collins, Veronica Sheaffer as Sue, Robyn Senchak as Chris, Ryan Lanning as Tommy and Tim Howard as Billy. The shows creative team included Bobbie Bagby as the choreographer, Matthew Kollar as the set designer, Bill Morey as the costumes designer and Doug MacDonald as the lighting designer with Robert Steel as the sound designer and John E. Buranosky on props.

The official cast album is on the Hell in a Handbag Productions website.

Hell in a Handbag launched another (and allegedly final) revival of Scarrie which started previews September 28 and opened October 6. It ran until November 10. The production was set to feature music from both the original and the 2005 production, as well as some new editions to the script and score. The revival starred Alex Grelle as Carrie, Danni Smith as Margaret White, Steve Love as Sue Snell and Aubrey Stanton as Chris Hargenson. Ed Jones (2005's Margaret White) played Miss Collins, AJ Wright played Tommy Ross, and David Lipschutz played Billy Nolan. As a treat to Handbag fans, writer David Cerda was featured in the production as well. The rest of the cast tok a traditional turn, in that all of Carrie's other classmates were played by females. The production was directed by Cheryl Snodgrass, with musical direction by Josh Walker and choreography by Kristen Smiley.

Reviews
The Chicago Reader said the original production "revels in its own mind-numbing stupidity" and, comparing it to the flop Broadway musical version of Carrie, said "a just plain terrible show and a self-consciously terrible show really aren't all that different".

Reviewing the 2005 revival, the Chicago Tribune said it needed half an hour cut but praised Joey Steakley, cross-dressing in the title role.  The Windy City Times praised the cast and called it a "triumph". The Chicago Reader said the revival was "often entertaining but never quite as funny as it could be".

Musical numbers

Act I
 "High School World" - Girls and Carrie White
 "Plug it Up" - Carrie, Girls and Miss Collins
 "These Are Godless Times" - Margaret White
 "I'm Carrie" - Carrie, Sue, Chris and Company
 "Say It" - Margaret, Carrie and Company
 "Beautiful" - Tommy and Company
 "Gonna Make You Sweat" - Miss Collins and Girls
 "Do it for Me" - Sue, Chris, Tommy and Billy
 "You're Not That Ugly" - Miss Collins and Carrie

Act II
 "Things Are Gonna Be Different" - Carrie, Sue and Company
 "Wham! Bam! Beautiful!" - Chris, Billy and Ensemble
 "It's the Prom" - Ensemble
 "Our Future Starts Today" - Candy
 "I'm Carrie - Reprise" - Carrie
 "Telekinetic Prom" - Carrie
 "Sin Never Dies" - Margaret
 "So it Goes" - Company

Notes

External links
 Carrie... A Fan's Site: Scarrie! The Musical
 Hell in a Handbag Productions official website

1998 musicals
Musicals based on films
Stage shows based on works by Stephen King